The Ministry of Internal Affairs of Moldova is one of the fourteen ministries of the Government of Moldova. It is the main executive body responsible for the Trupele de Carabinieri.

History
During the Moldavian Democratic Republic, Vladimir Cristi served as Director General for Internal Affairs.

The Ministry was created upon cessation by Soviet Union of Bessarabia which was part of Romania in 1940. On 8 August 1940 The Government of Soviet Union has announced creation of NKVD Internal affairs organization that was responsible public order and state secret service in newly created Moldavian Soviet Socialist Republic. After the World War II now with permanent soviet occupation local organization of NKVD on 26 March 1946 changes name to Ministry of Internal Affairs thus being direct inherit to current Ministry of Internal Affairs of Moldova.
On 18 December 1990 the Parliament of newly Independent Moldovan Republic adopted law in relation to name of police (Poliţia) instead of Militsiya.

Among the departments of the Ministry are the General Division of State Guard, the Division of Information and Operative Evidence and the Department of Public order.

Ministers

Structure
The ministry has the following organizational structure:

Cabinet of the Minister
Directorate of Policy Analysis, Monitoring and Evaluation 
Directorate of Policies in the Field of Public Order and Security
Directorate for Crime Prevention and Fight
Directorate for International Cooperation
Directorate of Policies in Integrated State Border Management Field
Directorate of Policies in Migration and Asylum
Directorate of Policies in Crisis Management and Emergency Situations field
Directorate of Staff Policies and Education
Policy Service in the field of population and citizenship evidence
Policy Service in the field of state material reserves
Special Issues Service
Internal Audit Service
Directorate of Institutional Management  
Juridical department 
Human Resources Department
Financial-Administrative Department
Department of Document Management
Information and communication service with the media

Subordinate institutions
General Police Inspectorate
Moldovan Border Police
General Inspectorate for Emergency Situations
Department of Carabineer Troops
The Migration and Asylum Bureau
Information Technology Service
Internal Protection and Anti-Corruption Service
Operational Leading and Inspection Service
Ștefan cel Mare Police Academy
Medical Service
Central Sports Club "Dinamo"
Material Reserves Agency

References

External links
Official website
General Police Inspectorate
Moldovan Border Police
General Inspectorate for Emergency Situations
Department of Carabineer Troops
Migration and Asylum Bureau
Ștefan cel Mare Academy
Central Sports Club
Material Reserves Agency

Internal affairs
Moldova
Moldova, Internal affairs